The Gorals (Goral dialect: Górole; ; Cieszyn Silesian: Gorole), also known as the Highlanders (in Poland as the Polish Highlanders) are an indigenous ethnographic or ethnic group primarily found in their traditional area of southern Poland, northern Slovakia and in the region of Cieszyn Silesia in the Czech Republic, where they are known as the Silesian Gorals. There is also a significant Goral diaspora in the area of Bukovina in western Ukraine and in northern Romania, as well as in Chicago, the seat of the Polish Highlanders Alliance of North America.

History
In the 12th century, Vlach shepherds migrated to the region, gradually moving northwest from the Balkan peninsula over the Carpathian Mountains and settling on Polish lands there. In the 16th and 17th centuries, Gorals settled the upper Kysuca and Orava rivers and part of northern Spiš in Slovakia, which at the time were part of the Kingdom of Hungary.  In the 19th century, between 1803–1819, the Gorals migrated to Bukovina.

Due to many local privileges and rights, including the Vlach law, Gorals enjoyed freedom from serfdom and had a large amount of autonomy. In 1651, the Gorals and local peasantry of Podhale rebelled against the Polish nobles (szlachta) in what became the Kostka-Napierski uprising, led by the adventurer and officer from the Polish army captain Aleksander Kostka Napierski. A film was produced about the uprising in 1956, and distributed in many languages across the Eastern Bloc. A second peasant rebellion in Podhale occurred in 1669, when Gorals and local peasants rebelled against high taxes and oppressive rule imposed on them by the nobility. The first Polish national opera, titled Krakowiacy i Górale (Cracowians and Gorals) composed by Wojciech Bogusławski premiered in 1794.

During World War II, Nazi Germany sought to Germanize the Gorals, and include them in the resettlement plans. Under Nazi racial laws, the majority of Poland's population and its minorities were viewed as "undesirable" and subject to special statutes, slave labour and police law. However, Nazi racial theorists considered the 27,000 strong Goral population as a separate ethnic group from the Poles. Termed , they were deemed part of the "Greater Germanic Race" and given separate (milder) treatment from other Poles.

Population

The Gorals inhabit a number of regions collectively referred to as the "Goral lands" (Goral: Góralscýzno, Polish: Góralszczyzna) split between Poland, Slovakia and Czechia. In Poland, the community inhabits the geographical region of Podhale of the Tatra Mountains and parts of the Beskids (Cieszyn Silesia, Silesian Beskids, Żywiec Beskids). After 1945, some Górals from Bukovina and the Podhale regions found new homes in Lower Silesia in villages such as Krajanów, Czarny Bór, and Borówna in the Central Sudete Mountains, as well as Złotnik, Brzeźnica and Lubomyśl in Lubusz Voivodeship.

In present-day Slovakia they live in 4 separate groups: in northern Spiš (34 villages subdivided into two groups), Orava and Kysuce (2 villages) and smaller groups in 7 other enclave villages in northern Slovakia.

The main settlements of Gorals include:
Zakopane
Żywiec
Nowy Targ
Zawoja

Language
The various dialects spoken by the Gorals descend from Proto-Indo-European, West Slavic, Lechitic and Eastern Romance languages. In particular, the language of Podhale, called the  Podhale dialect, is of Polish origin, but has been profoundly influenced by Slovak in recent centuries. It is a subdialect of the Lesser Polish dialect cluster. In addition to Polish, the language contains some vocabulary of uncertain origin that have cognates in other languages of the Carpathian region.

The Podhale dialect is the de facto standard literary Goral dialect due to Podhale being the most famously known region however, the majority of Gorals speak closely related dialects. Gorals themselves rarely differentiate between their dialects and just refer to them as Górolski.

The Polish dialects spoken by the Gorals share linguistic features with neighboring languages spoken by the Carpathian highlanders to the east, especially the Rusyn language of the Hutsuls, Lemkos, and Boykos.

Jabłonkowanie, a phonological feature similar to mazurzenie, occurs in some Silesian dialects. 14th- and 15th-century palatal consonant pronunciation features (called "Podhale archaisms") are preserved in the Podhale dialect. K. Dobroslowski asserted that the Podhale dialect had loan-words from Romanian and Albanian (1938), as well as similar belief system elements, music and material culture.

National identity

For most Gorals today, the decisive factor in their self-identification with nationality is not ethnic but territorial. For example, those living in areas under a long tradition of belonging to the Polish state identify themselves as Polish, while those living in Slovakia have identified themselves as Slovaks, with notable exceptions to this rule on both sides of the border. While the origin of the Goral dialect is Polish, the language of Gorals in Slovakia and in the Czech Republic is gradually shifting and increasingly becoming more similar to the literary standard in their respective countries. Silesian Gorals of the Czech Republic identify themselves on the nationality level as Poles and are members of the Polish minority in Zaolzie, which is proved by their communal activity: the annual Gorolski Święto festival held in Jablunkov (Jabłonków) is a showcase of a local Polish Goral traditions and is organized by the PZKO (Polish Cultural and Educational Union). This Goral festival preserves the traditions of the Polish nationality group in Zaolzie. It is the largest cultural and folklore festival in Zaolzie gathering thousands of spectators each day of festivities.

However, the Poles do not form a majority in any of the towns and villages of the area, and some local Gorals identify themselves on the nationality level as Czechs. In this respect, the village of Hrčava (the second easternmost village in the Czech Republic), with the vast majority of citizens declaring Czech nationality, can be noted. In this village, the Poles form only a 2% minority. Local Gorals formed (as indigenous people) a majority in the past. They speak the regional Cieszyn Silesian dialect in everyday communication.

Historically, the issue of their ethnic identity has been controversial and resulted in claims and counterclaims by both Poland and Czechoslovakia. Gorals, like many other peasant communities in Central Europe, determined their own ethnic identities within the nation-state system during the 19th and early 20th century. Although nationalist propaganda was generated by both Poles and Slovaks, this process of the Gorals' identification with a nationality was still not complete when the border was finalized in 1924. A notable example was Ferdynand Machay, a priest born in Jabłonka, Orava, Piotr Borowy from Rabča, Orava and Wojciech Halczyn from Lendak, Spiš, who went to the 1919 Paris Peace Conference and, during a personal audience, lobbied U.S. president Woodrow Wilson to sign these lands over to Poland. 

Currently, there is an ongoing national revival for Goral culture and identity. In Slovakia, Gorals are in the process of gaining autonomous recognition in Slovakia.

The Gorals have a similar belief system elements, music and material culture as that of the Vlachs and related groups (e.g. Moravian Vlachs), from whom it has been argued they originate. Carleton S. Coon grouped Gorals with the Hutsuls, who dwelled in what was then the southeastern corner of Poland and is now southwestern Ukraine. In the 19th century, Polish scholars viewed the Gorals as linguistically close to the Poles, but having close ties with Slovak folk culture. It was noted that Gorals' social and economic life resembled that of Vlach shepherd culture.

Culture

Architecture

The Zakopane Style architecture, established at the end of the 19th century, is held as a Goral tradition. The architectural style draws on local architecture and Vernacular architecture of the Carpathians, and is widespread in the Podhale region.

Music

Zakopower is a popular folk-pop musical group from Zakopane. The Trebunie-Tutki folk musical group from Zakopane blend traditional Goral music with reggae.

Folk costume

Clasps 
For centuries clasps have been an important element of Goral traditional costumes. Originally used for fastening shirts, they fell out of use when buttons became popular, remaining only as ornaments. In the early 20th century they were already rare, used only by senior and young shepherds, who grazed their sheep on mountain pastures. In the 1920s and the 1930s, they were considered collector's items and sought after by tourists. In Zakopane, they were often worn as ornaments for the "cucha" (outerwear), sweaters, or occasionally on leather bags. Today the clasps are a popular element of highlanders from the Podhale region, but the way they are worn differs from the original one: instead of fastening shirts they are usually attached to them or sewed on.

Parzenica (embroidery) 
The parzenica embroidery dates back to the mid-19th century. Initially, they were simple string loops, used for reinforcing cuts in front of cloth trousers. They had practical functions and protected the cloth from fraying. The modern look parzenica got from those tailors who began using red or navy blue string, simultaneously increasing the number of loops. Later the appliqué design was replaced with embroidery. Using woollen yarn allowed the parzenica to become more colourful and eventually it became a stand-alone trouser ornamentation, developed by talented tailors and embroiderers.

Corsets 
In the second half of the 19th century, it became fashionable in the Podhale region to adorn corsets with depictions of thistle and edelweiss. These motifs were the most popular in the early 20th century. When "Kraków style" came into fashion, highlanders of the Podhale region began ornamenting the corsets with shiny sequins and glass beads.

Other 
In Cieszyn Silesia and northern Slovakia, the shepherd's axe and elements of the folk costume are termed Vlach.

Goral folk costumes can be found in the National Museum of Ethnography in Warsaw, The Tatra Museum in Zakopane, the Ethnographic Museum of Kraków, and the City Museum of Żywiec.

Religion
Most Gorals are adherents of the Roman Catholic Church and are often noted for their staunch religiosity.

The Sanctuary of Our Lady of Ludźmierz is of particular importance to the Gorals, being the oldest monument in the Podhale region. There are numerous cults connected to the church.

A notable portion of Gorals are Augsburg Confession Lutherans, who are clustered around the town of Wisła. This is the main centre of protestant Gorals, and it is the only city in Poland where Catholics are a minority.

Notable people 

 Tomasz Adamek (born 1976) – Polish boxer
 Klemens Bachleda (1851–1910) – Polish mountain guide
 Alicja Bachleda-Curuś (born 1983) – Polish actress
 Stefan Banach (1892–1945) – Polish mathematician
 Tadeusz Błażusiak (born 1983) – Polish sport motorcyclist
 Józef Cukier (1889–1960) – Goralenvolk leader 
 Andrzej Dziubek (born 1954) – Polish–Norwegian musician
  (born 1976) – Polish singer
 Justyna Kowalczyk (born 1983) – cross-country skier
 Wacław Krzeptowski (1897–1945) – Goralenvolk leader
 Jerzy Kukuczka (1948–1989) – Polish alpinist
 Władysław Orkan (1875–1930) – Polish writer
 Jan Kanty Pawluśkiewicz (born 1942) – Polish composer
 Kazimierz Przerwa-Tetmajer (1865–1940) – Polish writer
 Włodzimierz Tetmajer (1861–1923) – Polish painter
 Józef Tischner (1931–2000) – Polish priest and philosopher

See also 
 Gorani, a Slavic Muslim highlander people in Kosovo
 Polish Uplanders

References

External links 

 Info-Portal Silesian Gorals in Polish
 Map showing the extent of Goral settlement
 An entry in Slovak
 Gorale – old photographs
 Goral dialect from linguistic point of view – covering several villages in Slovak part of Orava (in Slovak)
 Chicago Public Radio series on diaspora communities in Chicago, including one on Goral Music in Chicago

 
Ethnic groups in the Czech Republic
Ethnic groups in Poland
Ethnic groups in Slovakia
Indigenous peoples of Europe
Lesser Poland Voivodeship
Silesian Voivodeship